Amy Lynn Fuller (May 30, 1968 – March 11, 2023) was an American rower, three-time Olympian, and one time World Record holder. In 1993, she was acclaimed as the U.S. Rowing Female Athlete of the Year, and in 1995, she was a finalist for the James E. Sullivan Award, given annually to the nation's top amateur athlete.

Fuller earned trips to the Olympics in 1992, 1996, and 2000. In 1992, she brought home a silver medal in the women's 4-, and in 1996 and 2000, she placed in the top 6 in the women's 8+. Fuller also competed in eight World Championships, earning one gold medal and six silver medals (1989, 1991, 1993–95, 1997–98, and 1999).

Fuller died from breast cancer in Los Angeles on March 11, 2023, at the age of 54.

References 

 
 

1968 births
2023 deaths
Deaths from breast cancer
Deaths from cancer in California
Sportspeople from Inglewood, California
Rowers at the 1992 Summer Olympics
Rowers at the 1996 Summer Olympics
Rowers at the 2000 Summer Olympics
Olympic silver medalists for the United States in rowing
American female rowers
University of California, Santa Barbara alumni
World Rowing Championships medalists for the United States
Medalists at the 1992 Summer Olympics
21st-century American women